Qarshi refers to

 Qarshi, Uzbekistan
 Qarshi Industries, Lahore, Pakistan
 Qarshi Stadium, Qarshi, Uzbekistan
 Qarshi University, Lahore, Pakistan

Karshi refers to
 Karachi, aka Karshi, Sindh, Pakistan